State Route 833 (SR 833) is a  long east–west state highway in the southern portion of the U.S. state of Ohio. Its western terminus is at the West Virginia state line in Pomeroy, where it provides a connection to West Virginia Route 62 (WV 62) via the Pomeroy-Mason Bridge across the Ohio River.

Established in 2003, SR 833 follows the former alignment of US 33, which was given a new, more direct route into West Virginia through Ravenswood, West Virginia and on Interstate 77 (I-77) in West Virginia.  The West Virginia portion of decertified U.S. Route 33 was replaced by extending WV 62 to Ripley, West Virginia.

Route description
SR 833 exists entirely within the southern part of Meigs County.  This state highway is not included within the National Highway System (NHS).  The NHS is a network of routes identified as being most important for the nation's economy, mobility and defense.

History
When US 33 was re-routed through Meigs County in 2003 along SR 7, then easterly onto a new alignment onto the Ravenswood Bridge across the Ohio River into Ravenswood, West Virginia and a more direct connection with I-77, the former routing of US 33, running from the connection with WV 62 at the Pomeroy-Mason Bridge, through Pomeroy, and concurrently with SR 124 to the US 33/SR 7 interchange north of Pomeroy was given the designation of SR 833.

Major intersections

References

External links

 State Route 833 Endpoint Photos

833
Transportation in Meigs County, Ohio